Dialyceras discolor is a tree in the family Sphaerosepalaceae. It is endemic to Madagascar.

Distribution and habitat
Dialyceras discolor is known only from a few locations in the northeastern region of Sava. Its habitat is humid evergreen forests from sea-level to  altitude. None of the locations are within protected areas.

Threats
Dialyceras discolor is threatened because lemurs, and other animals, disperse the tree's seeds. Threats to these animals would in turn affect the tree's reproduction.

References

Sphaerosepalaceae
Endemic flora of Madagascar
Trees of Madagascar
Plants described in 1962
Flora of the Madagascar lowland forests
Taxa named by René Paul Raymond Capuron